Prayikkara Pappan is a 1995 Indian Malayalam-language film directed by T. S. Suresh Babu and written by Shaji Pandavath. The film stars Murali, Madhu, Jagadish, Bheeman Raghu, Sukumaran, Raghavan, Chippy, Geetha and Surendra Pal. The film's score was composed by S. P. Venkatesh.

Plot

Cast

Murali as Achuthan / Prayikkara Pappan
Madhu as Shankunni Moopan
Jagadish as Shivan
Bheeman Raghu as Parunthu Vavachan
Sukumaran as DFO James Antony
Chippy as Radha
Geetha as Gauri
Surendra Pal as Thekkan/Palani
Vijayakumar as Chandran 
Kuthiravattam Pappu as Ponnaran
Mamukkoya as Veerappan
Ganesh Kumar as Thomas
Indrans as Vettukili
Raghavan as Kanaran
Aliyar as Alavikutty
Chithra as Sarasu
Kollam Thulasi as Kannappan, Politician
Sabnam
Santhakumari as Gouris's mother
Meghanathan as Ramankutty, Gunda
Abu Salim as Hassan, Gunda
 Ponnambalam as Palani's main gunda
Sonia as Katthu
Kaladi Jayan as Pavithran
Kaladi Omana as Thomas's mother
Kumarakam Raghunath as Achuthan's father/Sreedharan

Production
T. S. Suresh Babu had Mohanlal in mind for the role of Prayikkara Pappan, but as writer Shaji Pandavath had already talked with Murali who was interested in playing the part, he was cast.

Soundtrack
The music was composed by S. P. Venkatesh with lyrics by Bichu Thirumala.

References

External links
 

1995 films
1990s Malayalam-language films